Ngelima, or Angba (Leangba), is a Bantu language spoken in the Democratic Republic of Congo. The four dialects (Beo, Buru (Boro), Tungu, Hanga) are quite distinct, and may be separate languages.

References

Bwa languages
Languages of the Democratic Republic of the Congo